The Batang Ai Dam is a concrete-face rock-fill dam in Batang Ai National Park in Sarawak, Malaysia. The station is operated by Sarawak Electricity Supply Corporation. Preparations for the dam began as early as 1975, before the design was published in 1977. Construction started in 1982 with the river diversion work and the last turbine completed in 1985. The Batang Ai project, a relatively modest dam financed by the Asian Development Bank, caused the displacement of approximately 3,000 people from 26 longhouses. These people have since been accommodated in the Batang Ai Resettlement Scheme to cultivate cocoa and rubber but the programme has not been successful.

See also 

 List of power stations in Malaysia
 National Grid, Malaysia

References

Notes 
 . Page 14 Table 2-1 Batang Ai Dam.
Kaur, Amarhit. "A History of Forestry in Sarawak." Modern Asian Studies 32.1 (1998): 117–47.

External links 
 Sarawak Electricity Supply Corporation

Hydroelectric power stations in Malaysia
Dams in Sarawak
Concrete-face rock-fill dams
Dams completed in 1985